"He's Alright" is a limited-edition vinyl single by American indie rock musician Kurt Vile, released on September 8, 2009 on Matador Records. The song appears on Vile's third studio album, Childish Prodigy (2009), as a hidden track.

The b-side, "Farfisas in Falltime", is an ambient instrumental recorded by Violators bandmate and frequent collaborator Adam Granduciel, while "Take Your Time" is an acoustic track recorded with Childish Prodigy producer Jeff Zeigler.

The song appears in the season two finale of HBO's comedy series, Eastbound and Down. Regarding its appearance, Vile noted, "That was really awesome. It was in this cool, emotional part at the end of the season, and I got so lucky to have my song on there, because the song is kind of emotional too."

Track listing
Side A
"He's Alright"

Side B
"Farfisas in Falltime"
"Take Your Time"

Personnel

Musicians
Kurt Vile - vocals, guitar
Jesse Trbovich - vibrato guitars ("He's Alright")

Recording personnel
Jeff Zeigler - recording ("He's Alright" and "Take Your Time")
Adam Granduciel - recording ("Farfisas in Falltime")

References

2009 singles
2009 songs
Matador Records singles